Samuel Kirkwood is a bronze statue created by Vinnie Ream and placed in the National Statuary Hall Collection in the Capitol Building in Washington, D.C., one of the two statues there from Iowa.  It was dedicated in 1913.

Ream, who had achieved some degree of fame as a teenager for her 1866 statue of Lincoln that stands in the Capitol, learned that the State of Iowa had decided to commission a statue of Kirkwood.  Despite the fact that Kirkwood had been one of the Congressmen who had voted against awarding the Lincoln statue to Ream, she set about getting and succeeded in garnering the opportunity to do it.  Ream had at that point been retired from sculpting for almost two decades but with the backing of Kirkwood's widow Jane Kirkwood won the assignment.  On April 5, 1906 the Iowa General Assembly voted to award the statue to Ream, along with $5,000 for the casting in bronze of her model.  Because she was not up to the physical demands of the task, Ream's husband Richard, an engineer, devised a special “boatswain’s chair”  that allowed her to raise and lower herself in a seated position while working on the statue.

In 1924, it was announced that a “handsome bronze statue of Iowa’s war governor” would be erected in front of the Iowa Old Capitol Building on the University of Iowa campus in Iowa City.  The plaster that Ream had made for the Washington, D.C., statue was still in her studio, though she had died a decade earlier. In November 1927, the new casting was completed and dedicated in front of the Old Capitol. In 1974, the statue was moved to Kirkwood Community College. There it was placed initially indoors in a new building then later moved to an exterior place on the campus.

References

External links
 

1913 sculptures
1927 sculptures
Monuments and memorials in Washington, D.C.
Kirkwood, Samuel
Outdoor sculptures in Iowa
Sculptures by Vinnie Ream
Sculptures of men in Iowa
Sculptures of men in Washington, D.C.
Statues in Iowa
Statues in Washington, D.C.